Health Care for Women International is a monthly peer-reviewed healthcare journal covering health care and related topics that concern women around the globe.

It is the official journal for Women's Health Issues and it is published by Taylor & Francis. Its editor-in-chief is Eleanor Krassen Covan (University of North Carolina at Wilmington).

History 
The journal was originally titled Issues in Health Care of Women (1978–1983).

The editor-in-chief from 1983 to 2001 was Phyllis Stern (University of Pennsylvania School of Nursing).

Abstracting and indexing 

According to the Journal Citation Reports, the journal has a 2015 impact factor of 0.950, ranking it 20th out of 40 journals in the category "Women's Studies" and 115th out of 153 journals in the category "Public, Environmental & Occupational Health".

See also 
 List of women's studies journals

References

External links 
 
 International Council on Women's Health Issues (ICOWHI)

Monthly journals
Publications established in 1978
Routledge academic journals
Women's health
Women's studies journals
Works about midwifery